The 2021–22 Pyramids FC season is the club's 14th season in existence and the fifth consecutive season in the top flight of Egyptian football. In addition to the domestic league, Pyramids are participating in this season's editions of the Egypt Cup, the EFA Cup and the CAF Confederation Cup.

Players

First-team squad

Out on loan

Pre-season and friendlies

Competitions

Overview

Egyptian Premier League

League table

Results summary

Results by round

Matches 
The league fixtures were announced on 12 October 2021.

Egypt Cup

EFA Cup

Group stage

CAF Confederation Cup

Qualifying rounds 

The draw for the qualifying rounds was held on 13 August 2021.

Second round

Play-off round

Group stage 

The draw for the group stage was held on 28 December 2021.

Knockout stage

Quarter-finals

References 

Pyramids FC
Pyramids